The 2023 FIM MotoGP World Championship will be the premier class of the 75th F.I.M. Road Racing World Championship season.

Teams and riders 

All teams use series-specified Michelin tyres.

Team changes
 RNF Racing will switch to Aprilia after a season with Yamaha.
 Suzuki have withdrawn from the MotoGP class at the end of the 2022 season.
 Tech3 KTM Factory Racing will be rebranded as GasGas Factory Racing Tech3. The team will be using Gas Gas-rebranded KTM bikes. Tech3 will continue to own and operate the team.

Rider changes
 Jack Miller will move to the KTM factory team from the Ducati factory team, replacing Miguel Oliveira. Oliveira will then move to RNF Aprilia MotoGP Team.
 Álex Márquez will move to Gresini Racing MotoGP from LCR Honda, replacing Enea Bastianini. Bastianini will then be promoted to the Ducati factory team, replacing Jack Miller.
 Álex Rins will move to LCR Honda from the now defunct Suzuki MotoGP team, replacing Álex Márquez.
 Pol Espargaró will move to the newly rebranded GasGas Factory Racing team from the Honda factory team. He will be replaced by Joan Mir, who will move from the now defunct Suzuki MotoGP team.
 Raúl Fernández will move to RNF Aprilia MotoGP Team from Tech3 KTM Factory Racing.
 Remy Gardner will leave MotoGP for the Superbike World Championship. He will be replaced by  Moto2 World Riders' Champion Augusto Fernández, who will enter the MotoGP class with the rebranded GasGas Factory Racing team.
 After being left without a place in the MotoGP grid, Darryn Binder went down to Moto2 to make his debut in that class.

Rule changes 
Sprint races will be introduced at all Grands Prix. Sprint races will be held at 15:00 on the Saturday of each Grand Prix weekend and will be approximately 50% of the total race distance. Points will be awarded to the top 9 finishers on a 12–9–7–6–5–4–3–2–1 basis, similar to the system being used in Superbike World Championship Superpole races. The grids for both the Sprint race and the Grand Prix race will be set from qualifying, which will retain its Q1–Q2 format. There will also be one less practice session and the warm-up session as a result. Sprint race wins are not considered as regular Grands Prix wins and instead would have their own "Sprint race wins" statistic.

The weekend format is now fixed for every event. Moto3 will be followed by Moto2, followed by MotoGP.

Minimum tyre pressure rules will be enforced. The use of any device that modifies or adjusts the motorcycle’s front ride height while it is moving is now forbidden.

Calendar 
The following Grands Prix are provisionally scheduled to take place in 2023:

Grand Prix locations

Calendar changes 
 For the first time since 2006, Lusail in Qatar will not host the opening round due to "extensive renovation and remodelling to the paddock area and circuit facilities".
 The British Grand Prix will return to the International Paddock of the Silverstone Circuit for the first time since 2012.
 India and Kazakhstan are both scheduled to host their first World Championship motorcycle Grands Prix in 2023 at the Buddh International Circuit and the Sokol International Racetrack, respectively.
 The Hungarian Grand Prix was scheduled to make its debut in 2023 but was postponed until at least 2024 due to the unstarted construction of the circuit.
 The Aragon Grand Prix was omitted from the schedule for the first time since its introduction in 2010.
 The Finnish Grand Prix at Kymi Ring was under contract to feature in 2023, but was not included in the provisional calendar due to safety concerns of the 2022 Russian invasion of Ukraine, and bankruptcy.

Results and standings

Grands Prix

Riders' standings
Scoring system
Points were awarded to the top fifteen finishers of the main race and to the top nine of the sprint race. A rider had to finish the race to earn points.

Constructors' standings
 Each constructor got the same number of points as their best placed rider in each race.

Teams' standings
The teams' standings were based on results obtained by regular and substitute riders; wild-card entries were ineligible.

Notes

References

External links
 

MotoGP
Grand Prix motorcycle racing seasons
MotoGP